The New Democratic Party of Ontario ran a full slate of candidates in the 1987 provincial election, and won 19 out of 130 seats to become the second-largest party in the Ontario legislature. Some of the party's candidates have their own biography pages; information about others may be found here.

Candidates

Brantford: Jack Tubman
Jack Tubman (died November 10, 2005) was a labour activist in Brantford. Born and raised in the city, he was educated at Wilfrid Laurier University and at the Labour College of Canada in Montreal.

Tubman served as president of the Canadian Auto Workers Local 397 in the 1980s and was a national staff representative in the union from 1987 until his death. He was also active with the Brantford and District Labour Council, which recognized him as Labour Citizen of the Year in 1981. Active in the Brant United Way, he was also a member of the Highway 403 east steering committee.

He joined the New Democratic Party in 1970. He was campaign manager for Member of Parliament Derek Blackburn and worked on campaigns in Manitoba and Alberta. In 1974, he ran for a seat on the Brantford City Council.

Tubman was an Ontario New Democratic Party candidate in 1985 and 1987, finishing second on both occasions. In 1991, he served on a provincial committee that proposed comprehensive reforms to Ontario's labour laws. The changes would have prohibited companies from hiring any person to do the work of a striking employee and made it easier for unions to organize.

In the buildup to the 1999 provincial election, Tubman recommended a strategic voting strategy to defeat Mike Harris's Progressive Conservative government. In 2002, he co-authored an article with Peter Leibovitch on revitalizing the federal New Democratic Party. The article called for an end to American influence in Canada's domestic affairs and for an endorsement of the right  to self-determination of Quebec and indigenous groups (although it did not endorse Quebec separatism). Tubman supported Joe Comartin in the 2003 New Democratic Party leadership election.

He died of cancer in 2005, at age fifty-seven.

St. Catharines: Rob West

West was president of the St. Catharines and District Labour Council in the 1980s, and spoke before a legislative committee in this capacity to oppose "no-fault" automobile insurance. He has also described himself as an owner-coordinator.

He received 5,566 votes (20.04%) in the 1987 election, finishing second against Liberal incumbent Jim Bradley.

West later ran for the federal New Democratic Party in the 1988 Canadian election, and finished third in the federal St. Catharines riding with 12,260 votes (25.45%). The winner was Ken Atkinson of the Progressive Conservative Party.

As of 2005, West is a representative of the Service Employees International Union, Local 1.ON. He has spoken out against health-care cuts in the St. Catharines area.

References

1987